Koldan (also Romanized as Koldān; also known as Kūledūn) is a village in Dalfard Rural District, Sarduiyeh District, Jiroft County, Kerman Province, Iran. At the 2006 census, its population was 203, in 46 families.

References 

Populated places in Jiroft County